Guy Forget and Jakob Hlasek were the defending champions, but did not participate this year.

Jim Grabb and Richey Reneberg won the title, defeating Scott Davis and David Pate 7–5, 2–6, 7–6 in the final.

Seeds
All seeds receive a bye into the second round.

Draw

Finals

Top half

Bottom half

References
Draw

Tennis tournaments in Japan
1991 ATP Tour
Tokyo Indoor